Lorraine-Dietrich was a French automobile and aircraft engine manufacturer from 1896 until 1935, created when railway locomotive manufacturer Société Lorraine des Anciens Etablissments de Dietrich and Cie (known as De Dietrich et Cie, founded in 1884 by Jean de Dietrich) branched into the manufacture of automobiles. The Franco-Prussian War divided the company's manufacturing capacity, one plant in Niederbronn-les-Bains, Alsace, the other in Lunéville, Lorraine.

Aircraft engines

Designations

Letter system
The Service technique de l'aéronautique (STAé) used a common designation system for the vast majority of their engines, which signified the major attributes of the particular engines:

 12 – the number of cylinders in any configuration (V, straight, W, horizontally opposed, radial, etc. etc.).
 Y – the family letter in capitals (note: in at least two instances the family designator consisted of two letters in capitals e.g. 14AA and 14AB), advancing alphabetically.
 a – sub variant indicator, (which could also indicate the rotation of the engine, where otherwise identical engines with opposite hand rotation were built, e.g. 12Ndr anti-clockwise and 12Nfr clockwise).
 r – attribute indicators, denoting various attributes that the engine might have, (r = reduction gearing, i = fuel injection, s = supercharged, etc. etc.)
 1 – sub-sub variants were denoted by using a number after the letters, (e.g. 12Xhrs and 12Xhrs1), usually indicating differences in ancillary equipment.

Thus the 12Xgrs was of the X family, with reduction gearing and supercharger. Whereas the 12Xhrs was identical but rotated in the opposite direction.

Source:Jane's All the World's Aircraft 1938
except where noted

Lorraine 3Dlicence-built Potez 3B
Lorraine 5P5 cyl radial
5Pa:
5Pb:
5pc:
Lorraine 6A(AM) 
Lorraine 6Ba6 cyl two-row radial 
Lorraine 7M Mizar7 cyl radial 
7Ma
7Me
Lorraine 8AV-8
8Aa
8Ab
8Aby
Lorraine 8BV-8
8Ba
8Bb
8Bd
8Be
Lorraine-Latécoère 8B
Lorraine 9N AlgolType 120 9 cyl radial 
Lorraine Algol Junior
Lorraine Algol Major
Lorraine Dietrich 12CcDc in error?
Lorraine 12? Hibis
Lorraine Dietrich 12CcDc in error?
Lorraine 12DV-12
12Da
12Db
12Dc
Lorraine 12 DOOhorizontally-opposed O-12
Lorraine 12E CourlisW-12 
12Eb:
12Ebr:
12Ed:
12Edr:
12Ee:
12Ew:The standard Eb fitted with a supplementary supercharger
Lorraine 12F CourlisW-12 
Lorraine 12H PétrelV-12
Lorraine 12Q Eider
12Qo
Lorraine 12R SternaV-12 Type 111 
12Rs:V-12 Type 111 
Lorraine 12Rcr Radiuminverted V-12 with turbochargers 
Lorraine 14A Antarès14 cylinder radial 
14Ac:14 cylinder radial 
Lorraine 14E14 cylinder radial  (could be mis-typing of 14Ae, or someone unfamiliar with the designation system writing 14E for Etoile – star - radial)
Lorraine 14L Antarès14 cylinder radial  (could be mis-typing of 14Al)
Lorraine 18F SiriusType 112
18F.0:
18F.00:
18F.100:
Lorraine 18G OrionW-18
18Ga:W-18
18Gad:W-18
Lorraine 18KW-18
18Ka
18Kd
18Kdrs
Lorraine 24W-24 
Lorraine 24E Taurus24-cyl in-line radial (six banks of 4-inline) 
Lorraine AM(moteur d’Aviation Militaire (A.M.)) – derived from German 6-cyl in-line engines
Lorraine Dieselbuilt in 1932, rated at 
Lorraine DM-400

ApplicationsData from:''Les moteurs d'Lorraine
1914 6A (A.M. -Aviation Militaire):
Farman F.40
1915 8Aa
Lorraine AM (Marine)
FBA Type C (Italian)
1915 8Aby
Donnet-Denhaut
FBA Type H
1916 8Ba
Donnet-Denhaut prototypes
FBA Type S
1916 12D
Hallbronn HT2
Latécoère 5
Latécoère 16
1917 12Da
CAMS-37
Latham 43
Lioré et Olivier H-10
SEA IV
Potez 7
Potez 9
Potez 12
Farman 120
Percheron 18
1917 8Bb
Nieuport 28
Tellier 1100
1918 12Db
Besson MB-26
Latham E5
Lioré et Olivier LeO 12
Levasseur PL3
Potez 11
Potez 15
Potez 17
Potez 23
Potez 27
Farman 60
Farman 62
Farman 3bis
Farman 122
Farman 150bis
Farman Super Goliath
1918 8Bd & 8Be
Nieuport 28
SPAD S XVI
Potez 18/1
Potez 21
Latécoère 15
Latécoère 18
Latécoère 22
1919 12Dc
Bernard 10T
Farman 72
Lioré et Olivier H-10
1922 12Eb & 12Ebr
Bernard V1
Breguet 19
Breguet 281T
CAMS- 37
Dewoitine D.12
Dewoitine D.14
Schreck FBA 21
GourdouLeseurre 33
Farman F.62 Goliath
SPAD 61/2
Nieuport-Delage NiD-44
Lioré et Olivier H-134
Lioré et Olivier 191
Levasseur PL4
Levasseur PL5
Levasseur PL8
Potez 25TOE
Potez 25/55
Potez 29
Villiers 4
Villiers 9
Villiers 10
1923 7Ma & 7Mb
Potez 32/2
Farman 75
1924 14Ac Antarès
Potez 29/6
1925 5Pa
Farman 232/1
1926 Lorraine 5Pb5Pb
Potez 36/23
Farman 204
Farman 352/2
Farman 402
Farman 405
Farman 480
Farman 1020
1927 5Pc
Schreck FBA 310
Farman 203
Farman 401
1927 12F Courlis:Potez 25/67
Potez 50
1927 18K, 18Kb, 18Kc 18Kd
Amiot 122
1928 7Me Mizar
CAMS 90
LeO H-222
Potez 33/1
Schreck FBA 171
Farman 197
Farman 306
1928 9Na Algol
Bernard 161
Bloch 120
Lioré et Olivier LeO-251
Schreck FBA 270
Potez 33/4
Potez 402
Farman 199
Farman 304
1928 14L
?
1929 18Ga Orion
Amiot 121
Amiot 122BP
Amiot 126
1930 12Rcr Radium
Nieuport-Delage NiD-651
Bernard HV-220
1930 12Hars
Potez 39/1bis
1930 12Q Eider
Amiot transatlantique
1931 12HdrsNieuport-Delage NiD-121
123

Specifications
Data from:
This table gives the major attributes of each engine model, where known.

References

Aircraft piston engines